The women's 4 × 100 metres relay at the 2018 IAAF World U20 Championships was held at Ratina Stadium on 13 and 14 July.

Records

Results

Heats
Qualification: First 3 of each heat ( Q ) plus the 2 fastest times ( q ) qualify for the final.

Final
The final was held on 14 July at 16:01.

References

4 x 100 metres relay
Relays at the World Athletics U20 Championships